Aníbal Roberto Tarabini (4 August 1941 – 21 April 1997) was an Argentine football player who played for the Argentina national team and was part of the squad for the 1966 World Cup. At club level, he won two league championships with Independiente in 1967 and 1970.

Biography
Tarabini made his debut in 1960 for Estudiantes de La Plata, in 1961 he joined 2nd division Temperley where he played until 1965.

In 1966 he joined Independiente where he is said to have played his best football and was part of the squad that won the Nacional in 1967 and the Metropolitano in 1970.

In 1971 Tarabini joined Boca Juniors where he played a total of 22 games in all competitions for the club, scoring three goals. He then went to Mexico where he played for (now defunct) Club de Fútbol Torreón until 1973.

Tarabini's last club was AS Monaco of France, he retired in 1974.

Later years
After his retirement as a player Tarabini went on to become the field assistant of José Omar Pastoriza. On April 21, 1997, he died in a traffic accident in Berazategui, Greater Buenos Aires.

Family
His daughter Patricia is a professional tennis player who won a bronze medal at the 2004 Summer Olympics.

Titles

References

External links

1941 births
1997 deaths
Footballers from La Plata
Argentine footballers
Argentine expatriate footballers
Association football forwards
Estudiantes de La Plata footballers
Club Atlético Independiente footballers
Boca Juniors footballers
AS Monaco FC players
Argentine Primera División players
Liga MX players
Ligue 1 players
Expatriate footballers in Mexico
Expatriate footballers in Monaco
Expatriate footballers in France
Argentine expatriate sportspeople in Monaco
Argentina international footballers
1966 FIFA World Cup players
Road incident deaths in Argentina
Burials at La Plata Cemetery